Alfred Peachey (born 1908) was an English professional footballer who played as a centre half.

Career
Born in St Helens, Peachey played for Atherton Collieries, Bradford City and Torquay United. For Bradford City, he made 191 appearances in the Football League; he also made 10 FA Cup appearances.

Peachey later joined Sligo Rovers and helped them to the final of the FAI Cup in 1939 which was lost to Shelbourne after a replay. He made 60 appearances for the club and also served as trainer.

Sources

References

1908 births
Year of death missing
English footballers
Atherton Collieries A.F.C. players
Bradford City A.F.C. players
Torquay United F.C. players
English Football League players
Association football defenders
Sligo Rovers F.C. players